Verkhny Tsa-Vedeno (Lakqa Ċena-Vedana)  is a rural locality (a selo) in Vedensky District, Chechnya.

Administrative and municipal status 
Municipally, Verkhny Tsa-Vedeno is incorporated into Tsa-Vedenskoye rural settlement. It is one of three settlements included in it.

Geography 

Verkhny Tsa-Vedeno is located on the left bank of the Khulkhulau River.

The nearest settlements to Verkhny Tsa-Vedeno are Tsa-Vedeno in the north, Verkhatoy in the north-west, Eshilkhatoy in the south, Elistanzhi in the south-west, Ersenoy in the south-east, and Agishbatoy in the east.

History 
In 1944, after the genocide and deportation of the Chechen and Ingush people and the Chechen-Ingush ASSR was abolished, the village of Verkhny Tsa-Vedeno was renamed, and settled by people from the neighboring republic of Dagestan. From 1944 to 1958, it was a part of the Vedensky District of the Dagestan ASSR.

In 1958, after the Vaynakh people returned and the Chechen-Ingush ASSR was restored, the village regained its old Chechen name, Verkhny Tsa-Vedeno.

Population 
 2002 Census: 0
 2010 Census: 556
 2019 estimate: ?

According to the 2010 Census, the majority of residents of Verkhny Tsa-Vedeno were ethnic Chechens.

References 

Rural localities in Vedensky District